Reba Ray (1876 – 1957) was an Indian Odia poet educationist and administrator. Best known as one of the earliest Odia women writers, she was also founder of Model Girls' School, Cuttack. Her short story Sanyasi is considered earliest modern Odia short story by a woman writer. She was niece of renowned Odia poet Madhusudan Rao.

Personal life
She was born on 1857. Many of her early life details are not known. She was married to well known writer Sadhu Charan Ray.

Career 
She was one of the pioneers for women's education. She established Model Girls' School at Cuttack in 1906. It had provision for teaching  music and sewing. She founded a woman's magazine Asha in 1892. She also founded Odisha's first children's magazine Prabhat. Her stories were published in Utkal Sahitya magazine as well. She set up another school at Guhali, Jajpur.

Published works
 Anjali , 1903 
 Shakuntala, 1904

References

1876 births
1957 deaths
Indian women writers
People from Odisha
20th-century Indian writers
19th-century Indian writers
Women writers from Odisha
Odia-language writers
Odia-language poets
People from Cuttack district
People from Jajpur district
20th-century Indian women
20th-century Indian people
Poets in British India